Edgar "Puddinghead" Battle (October 3, 1907 – February 6, 1977) was an American jazz multi-instrumentalist, composer, and arranger. He performed on trumpet, trombone, saxophone, and keyboard.

Early life and education 
Battle was born into a musical family in Atlanta. He started playing trumpet and formed his own band, the Dixie Serenaders, while he was a student at Morris Brown University in 1921. The group changed their name to Dixie Ramblers a few years later.

Career 
Battle played with Eddie Heywood Sr., and toured with the 101 Ranch Boys traveling show. In the 1920s, he worked with Gene Coy, Andy Kirk, Blanche Calloway, Ira Coffey, and Willie Bryant. He moved to New York City in the early-1930s and did short stints with Benny Carter and Sam Wooding, before joining George White's ensemble on Broadway. Over time, he began doing more work as a studio musician and arranger, writing charts for Cab Calloway, Paul Whiteman, Fats Waller, Earl Hines, Rudy Vallee, and Count Basie.

During World War II, Battle held a position as an electrician in a shipyard, concomitantly running a big band with Shirley Clay. In the 1950s, he founded Cosmopolitan Records, and continued to play in big bands part-time through the 1960s. Among his numerous jazz compositions are the pieces "Topsy" (co-composed with Eddie Durham) and "Doggin' Around" (with Herschel Evans).

Personal life 
Edgar Battle died in New York in February 1977, at the age of 69.

See also
 List of jazz arrangers

References

1907 births
1977 deaths
American jazz trumpeters
American male trumpeters
American jazz trombonists
Male trombonists
American jazz saxophonists
American male saxophonists
Musicians from Georgia (U.S. state)
20th-century American saxophonists
20th-century trumpeters
20th-century trombonists
20th-century American male musicians
American male jazz musicians